Gholamreza Ghodsi (1925 – 11 December 1989) was a belletrist and poet from Mashhad, Iran.

Early life and education
Ghodsi was born in 1925 in Mashhad, Iran. His genealogy goes back to Mirza Mohammad Jan Ghodsi Mashhadi, the celebrated poet of Safavid era who was the head of Astan Quds treasury and traveled there at the era of Shah Jahan which was the era of Persian poetry prosperity. After completing the primary school, Ghodsi initiated Qadimeh studies.

He started poetry writing when he was sixteen years old.

Career
Ghodsi founded "Ferdowsi Athenaeum" of Mashhad, with the aim of organizing the literary situation of his homeland. He founded this athenaeum with some of his friends in 1946.

He traveled to India for compiling poems of his great grandfather Mirza Mohammad Jan Ghodsi Mashhadi and his goal was to gain other manuscripts of this poet.

Professor Ghodsi taught Persian and Arabic language and Literature at Ferdowsi University of Mashhad.
He died on 11 December 1989 at the age of 64 and he was buried at block 168, in Azadi Courtyard of Imam Reza holy shrine in Mashhad.

Poems

"I wish I were..." (lyric of "Kash Bodam Lala کاش بودم لاله" performed by Ahmad Zahir)
"Enough for us" (lyric of "Ma ra bas ما را بس" composed by Majid Derakhshani)

Bibliography
"Collection of Poems", the book "Contemporary Poetry in Khorassan", 1964.
"Collection of Poems", Iranian Contemporary Lyric
Diwan of Poems "Songs of Ghodsi", Culture and Guidance General Administration publications, 1991. (with introduction of Mehrdad Avesta)
"Collection of Poems", the book "a Breeze from the Region of Khorassan", 1991.
" Companions of the Prophet", about history of Islam, Besat publications

Resources
Persian Literature I (part II), high school textbook, Curriculum and Textbooks Department Office
Persian Literature III, humanities, high school textbook, Curriculum and Textbooks Department Office
Bagherzadeh (Bagha), Ali, Twenty One Articles, Mashhad: Sokhan Gostar, 2008.
Selected Texts of Persian Literature, university textbook, Nashr Daneshgahi publications, .
Selected Texts of Persian Literature, university textbook, Nashr Daneshgahi publications, .
Motavalli, Ahmadreza, "The Picked Flowers Smell", Khorassan daily, issue 14006, 8 December 1997.

References

External links 

20th-century Iranian poets
Iranian male poets
Academic staff of Ferdowsi University of Mashad
1925 births
1989 deaths
20th-century male writers
Burials at Imam Reza Shrine